5T may refer to:

 5T (gang)
 Canadian North IATA code
5T, a model of HPI Savage
HP 5T, Windows codepage 1254 in Hewlett-Packard printers
 OnePlus 5T, a smartphone
5T, the production code for the 1981 Doctor Who serial The Keeper of Traken

See also
T5 (disambiguation)